Coronis may refer to:

Coronis (diacritic)
Coronis (mythology)
Coronis (lover of Apollo)
Coronis (textual symbol)
, a repair ship that served in World War II
Coronis, a zarzuela by Spanish composer Sebastián Durón
A genus of butterfly, for species such as Coronis hyphasis

See also
 
 Corone (disambiguation)
 Koronis (disambiguation)